Marina Marković Марина Марковић (born 19 November 1991) is a Serbian basketball player for Talleres and the Serbian national team, where she participated at the 2014 FIBA World Championship.

Personal life
Her father is Petar Marković, a basketball coach.

References

External links
Profile at eurobasket.com

1991 births
Living people
Basketball players from Belgrade
Serbian expatriate basketball people in Argentina
Serbian expatriate basketball people in Bosnia and Herzegovina
Serbian expatriate basketball people in Spain
Serbian expatriate basketball people in France
Serbian expatriate basketball people in Germany
Serbian women's basketball players
Serbian women's 3x3 basketball players
Small forwards
ŽKK Radivoj Korać players
ŽKK Vršac players
ŽKK Šumadija Kragujevac players